Vardeh Sara (also Romanized as Vārdeh Sarā; also known as Vārdeh Sar, Vāredeh Sarā, Vāredeh Sarā-ye Pā’īn, Varudakhsar, Varūdsar, and Warūdahsar) is a village in Asalem Rural District, Asalem District, Talesh County, Gilan Province, Iran. At the 2006 census, its population was 296, in 77 families.

References 

Populated places in Talesh County